Ross A. Hunter (born September 15, 1961) is a Democratic Party politician. He served in the Washington House of Representatives, representing the 48th legislative district from 2003 to 2015.

Political career
Hunter was elected to the Washington House of Representatives in 2002, representing the 48th legislative district as a Democrat. He served as the chairman of the House Appropriations Committee, where he oversaw the drafting of the state's bi-annual operating budget, and was a member of the Washington State Economic Revenue Forecast Council.

 Appropriations
 Economic and Revenue Forecast Council

Hunter is a prolific blogger and uses his writing as a means of recapping complex legislative issues and transparently communicating with constituents.

Hunter resigned from the State House in 2015 when Governor Jay Inslee appointed him to direct the Washington State Department of Early Learning.

Personal
After graduating from Yale University with a B.S. in computer science, Hunter's first job out of college was at Microsoft. He spent 17 years with the company and rose to be a general manager. Hunter lives with his wife in Medina, Washington. Hunter is active in local charities. Hunter serves on the steering committee for Bellevue Quality Schools and has a long history of working with children in Cub Scouts. He has also served as a trustee of the Bellevue Schools Foundation from 2001 to 2010 and as a board member of Hopelink, the Eastside's largest nonprofit human services agency, from 2004 to 2010.

References

External links
Washington State House of Representatives – Rep. Ross Hunter 
Official Ross Hunter Blog

1961 births
Living people
Democratic Party members of the Washington House of Representatives
Microsoft employees
Yale University alumni
American Quakers
People from Medina, Washington